Partick East/Kelvindale (Ward 23) is one of the 23 wards of Glasgow City Council; used since the 2017 local election, it is one of two created from the Local Government Boundary Commission for Scotland's 5th Review. The ward returns four council members.

Boundaries
Situated to the west of Glasgow city centre, the ward was formed from parts of the former wards (as they existed until 2017) of Hillhead, Partick West, and Maryhill/Kelvin. Its territory covers the areas of Kelvindale, Kelvinside, Dowanhill, Hyndland, Partickhill, part of Anniesland (streets to the east of the Argyle Line railway) and most of Partick (streets to the west and north of the Argyle/North Clyde Line railway). It is bordered to the north-east by parts of the River Kelvin and Forth and Clyde Canal and by Byres Road to the south-east.

Demographics
According to the 2011 census, the ethnicity of the population is:

Councillors

Election results

2022 election
2022 Glasgow City Council election

2017 election
2017 Glasgow City Council election

In May 2021 Greens Cllr Martin Bartos resigned his party membership, while remaining as an independent councillor.

2021 by-election
Conservative Cllr Tony Curtis resigned from the party in July 2020 in protest for the party's lack of support for the fitness industry. He then represented the council as an independent until his disqualification on 11 January 2021, after not attending council meetings for six months. A by-election for the seat was held on 18 March 2021. Labour candidate Jill Brown won the by-election.

See also
Wards of Glasgow

References

External links
Listed Buildings in Partick East/Kelvindale Ward, Glasgow City at British Listed Buildings

2017 establishments in Scotland
Wards of Glasgow
Partick